Biz (Biź) is a rural locality (a village) in Aksaitovsky Selsoviet, Tatyshlinsky District, Bashkortostan, Russia. The population was 87 as of 2010. There is 1 street.

Geography 
Biz is located 28 km west of Verkhniye Tatyshly (the district's administrative centre) by road. Artaulovo is the nearest rural locality.

References 

Rural localities in Tatyshlinsky District